The University of Ljubljana's Faculty of Public Administration is a faculty involved mainly with training students in management and finance in the context of the public sector.

International cooperation 

The Faculty of Public Administration as part of the University of Ljubljana is involved in international academic relations. This includes exchanging students, teaching and research staff; the Faculty has also participated in various project activities, research programmes, publications and the organisation of scientific expert meetings.

The main activities of international cooperation at the Faculty of Public Administration include:

International exchange of students and teaching staff
The international exchange of professors has been a standard practice of the Faculty, realised through various professional training schemes and visiting lecturer positions.

Visiting lecturers
A number of renowned foreign professors have lectured at the Faculty of Public Administration.

International Accreditation of Study Programmes

The Faculty of Public Administration acquired European accreditations by the EAPAA - European Association for Public Administration Accreditation for two first cycle programmes and one postgraduate programme, becoming the first Slovenian educational institution with such a distinguished accreditation.

Joint study programmes
The Faculty offers 2 joint study programmes.

Bilateral agreements with foreign universities

Bilateral agreements have served different purposes at different times, such as being actively used for student and staff exchange and also for project cooperation, curricula development and EU project participation. The Faculty has bilateral agreements with 51 universities and institutes in 24 countries for the 2014/15 academic year.

Theme networks

The Faculty of Public Administration actively participates in the following international organizations:

EGPA (European Group of Public Administration),
IIAS (International Institute of Administrative Sciences),
IASIA (International Association of Schools and Institutes of Administration),
EPAN (European Public Administration Network),
EAPAA (European Association for Public Administration Accreditation)
NISPAcee (Network of Institutes and Schools of Public Administration in Central and Eastern Europe),
NASPAA (National Association of Schools of Public Affairs and Administration).

History

The Faculty of Pubilc Administration is one of the youngest members of the University of Ljubljana as a full faculty, but is actually an institution with a long tradition. In 1956, the School of Public Administration was established; in 1995, it was transformed into the University School of Public Administration. On 5 April 2003 the University School of Public Administration officially became the Faculty of Public Administration.

Today the Faculty carries out its mission in undergraduate and graduate education programmes, research, development and consulting activities, professional training of civil servants, and international cooperation, concentrating on the following fields:

 Legal regulation and development in the public sector
 Public sector organisation
 Public sector economics
 Public finance
 Public sector management
 Public sector information systems and development of e-administration.

The Faculty continues to develop existing programmes, while introducing the new joint study programmes prepared in cooperation with faculties abroad.

It is also introducing new forms of study, such as distance learning, problem-based learning, and teamwork.

Administration
Educational institutions established in 1946
1946 establishments in Yugoslavia